The Randenigala Dam is a large hydroelectric embankment dam at Rantembe, in the Central Province of Sri Lanka. The dam and power station was ceremonially opened by then President J. R. Jayawardene in 1986.

Dam 

The embankment dam is made mostly of rocks, and consists of a clay core.

Reservoir 

The dam creates the Randenigala Reservoir.

In addition to this, the reservoir is also topped up with water from the Victoria Reservoir upstream, and the Mahaweli River.

Power station 

The power station is located immediately downstream of the dam, on the left bank.

The plant consists of two generators with a rated capacity of  each, powered by two francis turbines. The units were commissioned in August and September 1986 respectively.

See also 

 List of dams and reservoirs in Sri Lanka
 List of power stations in Sri Lanka

References

External links 
 

Buildings and structures in Kandy District
Dams in Sri Lanka
Hydroelectric power stations in Sri Lanka
Dams completed in 1986
Embankment dams